The Bede BD-14 was an American homebuilt aircraft, designed by Jim Bede and produced by Bede Aircraft of Medina, Ohio, introduced in the 1990s. The aircraft was intended to be supplied as a kit for amateur construction, but only one was ever built.

Design and development
Designed as a four-seat development of the Bede BD-12, which was, in turn, a two-seat version of the single-seat Bede BD-5, the BD-14 was to feature a cantilever low-wing, a four-seat enclosed cockpit under a gull-wing canopy, retractable tricycle landing gear and a single engine in pusher configuration. The aircraft was built from fibre-reinforced plastic composite materials.

The company that currently owns the rights to the design, BedeCorp, indicates that production was not started due to the cost of tooling and the lack of funds.

Operational history
In April 2015 no examples were registered in the United States with the Federal Aviation Administration, although one had been registered to the designer at one time.

Variants
BD-14A
Prototype
BD-14B
Proposed production version.

Specifications (BD-14A)

References

External links

BD-14
1990s United States sport aircraft
1990s United States civil utility aircraft
Single-engined pusher aircraft
Low-wing aircraft
Homebuilt aircraft